Starigrad is a small village near Senj, Croatia. It is connected by the D8 highway.

References

Populated places in Lika-Senj County